The Agariya, or Agaria is a title of Chunvalia Kolis who are salt farmers in Kutch district of Gujarat, India. in 2019, Koli Agariyas faces the great loss of salt trade because of the Trade war between China and United States of America.

They produce the 30% of the salt of the total of country. they were listed as Criminal Tribe under Criminal Tribes Act of 1871 by British Indian government because of their rebellions against British rule in India.

The Koli Agariyas were landowners of the land of Little Rann of Kutch but in 1978 this area was declared as Wild Ass Sanctuary by Government of Gujarat and their lands were captured by Gujarat government. Koli Agariyas demanding recognition as farmers and an assurance that they have a legal right on Little Rann of Kutch land for salt farming to get the benefit like agriculture farmers such as money package and relief for natural calamities like flood.

Clans 
Here are some of the clans used by Agariya title holder Kolis of Kutch,

 Jhala
 Makwana
 Jadav
 Chudasama
 Chauhan
 Parmar
 Rangpara
 Munjapara
 Jhinjhuvadia
 Katosana

Classification 
The Koli Agarias are classified as Other Backward Class by Government of Gujarat but in past they were notified as Criminal Tribe.

Organisations 

 Agariya Hitrakshak Manch

References 

Salt industry in India
Kutch district
Gujarat